Majid Torkan (born 15 November 1964) is a retired Iranian freestyle wrestler. He won a world title in 1990, placing second in 1985 and third in 1989. He also won gold medals at the Asian Games in 1986 and at the Asian Championships in 1983, 1989 and 1991. He competed at the 1988 and 1992 Olympics and placed seventh in 1992.

References

Wrestlers at the 1988 Summer Olympics
Wrestlers at the 1992 Summer Olympics
Iranian male sport wrestlers
Olympic wrestlers of Iran
1964 births
Living people
Asian Games gold medalists for Iran
Asian Games medalists in wrestling
Wrestlers at the 1982 Asian Games
Wrestlers at the 1986 Asian Games
World Wrestling Championships medalists

Medalists at the 1986 Asian Games
Sportspeople from Sari, Iran
Asian Wrestling Championships medalists
20th-century Iranian people
21st-century Iranian people
World Wrestling Champions